The women's team event at the 2008 Summer Olympics in Beijing, China, took place at the Beijing National Aquatics Center from 22 to 23 August. The Russian squad had displayed their complex choreography with an unmatched precision in the free routine to defend their Olympic title for the third straight victory, having received a nearly perfect mark of 99.500 by the judges. Spain picked up a silver with 98.251 points, while the Chinese squad surpassed the 2004 Olympic silver medal team Japan by nearly a two-point advantage to claim a bronze for the host nation's first ever Olympic medal, recording a composite score of 97.334.

Eight teams competed, each consisting of eight swimmers (from a total team of nine swimmers). There was a single round of competition. Each team presents two routines: a technical routine and a free routine. The technical routine consists of twelve required elements, which must be completed in order and within a time of between 2 minutes 35 seconds and 3 minutes 5 seconds. The free routine has no restrictions other than time; this routine must last between 3 minutes 45 seconds and 4 minutes 15 seconds.

For each routine, the team is judged by two panels of five judges each. One panel is the technical jury, the other is the artistic jury. Each judge gives marks of between 0 and 10. The highest and lowest score from each panel are dropped, leaving a total of six scores which are then summed to give the routine's score. The scores of the two routines are then added to give a final score for the team.

Schedule 
All times are Beijing Standard Time UTC+8

Results

References

External links
 ESPN Olympic Guide
 Synchronized Swimming Results – New York Times

2008
2008 in women's sport
Women's events at the 2008 Summer Olympics